The fifth round of the women's team pursuit of the 2008–2009 UCI Track Cycling World Cup Classics took place in Copenhagen, Denmark on 15 February 2009. 10 teams participated in the contest.

Competition format
The women's team pursuit consists of a 3 km time trial race between two riders, starting on opposite sides of the track. If one team catches the other, the race is over.

The tournament consisted of an initial qualifying round.  The top two riders in the qualifying round advanced to the gold medal match and the third and fourth riders advanced to the bronze medal race.

Schedule
Sunday 15 February
11:35-12:35 Qualifying
16:40-16:55 Finals
17:20-17:30 Victory Ceremony

Schedule from Tissottiming.com

Results

Qualifying

Results from Tissottiming.com.

Finals

Final bronze medal race

Results from Tissottiming.com.

Final gold medal race

Results from Tissottiming.com.

See also
 2008–2009 UCI Track Cycling World Cup Classics – Round 5 – Women's individual pursuit
 2008–2009 UCI Track Cycling World Cup Classics – Round 5 – Women's points race
 UCI Track Cycling World Cup Classics – Women's team pursuit

References

2008–09 UCI Track Cycling World Cup Classics
2009 in Danish women's sport
UCI Track Cycling World Cup – Women's team pursuit